Peter Paul Fix (March 13, 1901 – October 14, 1983) was an American film and television character actor who was best known for his work in Westerns. Fix appeared in more than 100 movies and dozens of television shows over a 56-year career between 1925 and 1981. Fix was best known for portraying Marshal Micah Torrance, opposite Chuck Connors's character in The Rifleman from 1958 to 1963. He later appeared with Connors in the 1966 Western film Ride Beyond Vengeance and The Time Tunnel episode, ""End of the World".

Early life and military service
Paul Fix was born Paul Fix Morrison. His mother and father were German immigrants who had left their Black Forest home and arrived in New York City in the 1870s. 

Following the United States' entry into World War I in April 1917, Fix joined the National Guard, initially serving at Peekskill, New York. After three months of duty there, he went AWOL and enlisted in the U.S. Army. After serving at Fort Slocum for three months, he again went AWOL and then enlisted in the U.S. Navy, and was stationed in Providence, Rhode Island. While serving in the Navy, Fix was recruited to perform on stage in a Navy Relief Organization production of the comic opera H.M.S. Pinafore. Later, he served as a hospital corpsman aboard ships transporting American troops to and from Europe, and continued that assignment until he was officially discharged from military service on September 5, 1919.

Stage and films
Following the war, Fix became a busy character actor, who got his start in local productions in New York. By the 1920s, he had moved to Hollywood, and performed in the first of almost 350 movie and television appearances. In the 1930s, he became friends with John Wayne. He was Wayne's acting coach and eventually appeared as a featured player in about 27 of Wayne's films.

Fix worked in early films such as Lucky Star (1929) with Janet Gaynor and Charles Farrell and Ladies Love Brutes (1930), and became a regular performer for the film's director, Frank Borzage, on a further eight occasions. Fix later appeared as Richard Bravo in the 1950s cult classic, The Bad Seed (1956) with Nancy Kelly, The Sea Chase (1955) with John Wayne and Lana Turner, playing Heinz the cook, and in George Stevens' Giant (1956) with James Dean, portraying Elizabeth Taylor's father.

Fix appeared as the presiding judge in To Kill a Mockingbird (1962) with Gregory Peck. He played the sheriff in The Sons of Katie Elder (1965) with John Wayne and Dean Martin. In 1966, he appeared in the film El Dorado with Wayne and Robert Mitchum. In 1972, he was cast in the film Night of the Lepus, and the following year, he portrayed the New Mexico rancher Pete Maxwell in Pat Garrett and Billy the Kid with James Coburn. In 1979, he appeared in Wanda Nevada. Fix co-wrote the screenplay for the John Wayne film Tall in the Saddle.

Television
Although Fix is best-remembered for his recurring role as Marshal Micah Torrance on ABC's Western series The Rifleman, he also performed in guest-starring roles in many other television programs between the 1950s and late 1970s. In the 1958 episode "The Golden Gun" on the ABC/Warner Bros.' Western Colt .45, he portrayed Frank Wilson Sr., the father of Frank Jr., played by Edd Byrnes.

On Christmas Day, 1958, Fix appeared in the episode "Medal for Valor" on CBS's Dick Powell's Zane Grey Theater. Fix plays Rufus Stewart, a businessman who hires David Manning, played by Richard Basehart, a man with an ill wife, who is in need of medical treatment, to substitute in the American Civil War for Stewart's son, Adam, portrayed by Richard Anderson. Manning, who won a Medal of Honor, returns from three years in the United States Army with an affidavit certifying that he was a military substitute so that he can claim western land. Rufus Stewart reneges on the promise because the son, the local sheriff, is running for the United States House of Representatives. Oddly, Rufus ends up being shot to death in a confrontation that he caused, and Adam agrees to provide the affidavit to Manning. The episode does not reveal if the sheriff was elected to Congress, but considers the political liability of one having hired a substitute in the war.

Fix guest-starred on the short-lived detective series, Meet McGraw and on the Western series of Rory Calhoun and John Payne, The Texan and The Restless Gun, which aired, respectively, in the same time slot on Mondays on CBS and NBC.

Fix played the historical role of U.S. President Zachary Taylor in the 1960 episode "That Taylor Affair" of the NBC Western series, Riverboat, with Darren McGavin. Arlene Dahl was cast in this episode as Lucy Belle.

In 1961, Fix appeared as Ramsey Collins in the series finale, "Around the Dark Corner", of the NBC crime drama Dante. That same year, he played Dr. Abel in the episode "The Haven" on The DuPont Show with June Allyson. His other television credits include Adventures of Superman (1953–1954, with Anthony Caruso and Elisha Cook Jr.) and the adventure series, Northwest Passage.

Fix played Dr Mark Piper in the second pilot episode of Star Trek, "Where No Man Has Gone Before". When the first series was filmed, his character was replaced by Leonard McCoy, played by DeForest Kelley.

Fix made five appearances as District Attorney Hale on Perry Mason (1957–1963), showing great skill as an examiner who did not ask objectionable questions unlike Hamilton Burger, who often experienced a judge's ire for asking leading questions. He guest-starred on such television series as Rawhide (1959), Wagon Train (1962), The Twilight Zone (1964), The F.B.I. (1965–1973), Voyage to the Bottom of the Sea (1966), The Time Tunnel (1966), The Wild Wild West (1966–1967),  Gunsmoke (1967), Daniel Boone (1969), Owen Marshall: Counselor at Law (1971), The Rockford Files episode "The House on Willis Avenue" (as Joe Tooley), and two episodes of The Streets of San Francisco, one in 1973 and again in 1975, each a different character/storyline. He appeared on the NBC series Kentucky Jones (1964) as Judge Perkins in the episode "Spare the Rod". He played an aging suicidal novelist named Maxwell Hart on the Emergency! fourth-season episode "Kidding", where paramedic John Gage, played by Randolph Mantooth, was in charge of a small group of intellectual 10- and 11-year-old school children on a tour of Rampart General Hospital. In 1974, he made an appearance as an old friend of Steve Austin's in the TV series The Six Million Dollar Man in the episode "Population Zero". He also appeared as Kronus, a retired fleet commander on the original Battlestar Galactica.

Fix played the hardy pioneer James Briton "Brit" Bailey in the 1969 episode "Here Stands Bailey" of Death Valley Days.

Personal life and death
His daughter Marilyn married actor Harry Carey Jr., in 1944, and they had four children of their own.

Fix died of kidney failure in Los Angeles at the age of 82.

Selected filmography

 The Perfect Clown (1925) as Bellhop (uncredited)
 Hoodoo Ranch (1926)
 The First Kiss (1928) as Ezra Talbot
 Lucky Star (1929) as Joe
 Ladies Love Brutes (1930) as Slip
 Man Trouble (1930) as The Kid - A Gunman (uncredited)
 The Good Bad Girl (1931) as Roach
 The Fighting Sheriff (1931) as Jack Cameron
 Doctors' Wives as Interne (uncredited)
 The Avenger (1931) as Juan Marietta (uncredited)
 Sob Sister (1931) as Minor Role (uncredited)
 Bad Girl (1931)
 Young as You Feel (1931) as Desk Clerk (uncredited)
 Three Girls Lost (1931) as Tony Halcomb (uncredited)
 South of the Rio Grande (1932) as Juan Olivarez
 The Racing Strain (1932) as King Kelly
 Life Begins (1932) as Anxious Expectant Father (uncredited)
 The Last Mile (1932) as Eddie Werner - Cell 8
 Scarface (1932) as Hood with Gaffney (uncredited)
 Dancers in the Dark (1932) as Benny
 The Night of June 13 (1932) as Reporter (uncredited)
 Somewhere in Sonora (1933) as Bart Leadly
 The Important Witness (1933) as Tony
 Fargo Express (1933) as Mort Clark
 The Mad Game (1933) as Lou
 Devil's Mate (1933) as Malony
 The Avenger (1933) as Vickers
 The Important Witness (1933) as Tony
 The Sphinx (1933) as Dave Werner
 Emergency Call (1933) as Dr. Mason (uncredited)
 Zoo in Budapest (1933) as Heinie
 The Woman Who Dared (1933) as Racketeer
 Gun Law (1933) as Tony Adams
 The Westerner (1934) as Rustler Who Confesses (uncredited)
 The World Accuses (1934) as John Weymouth
 Rocky Rhodes (1934) as Joe Hilton
 The Count of Monte Cristo as Angry Citizen (uncredited)
 The Crosby Case (1934) as Engineer (uncredited)
 Little Man, What Now? (1934) as Lauderbock
 Reckless (1935) as Man on Mechanical Horse (uncredited)
 The Crimson Trail (1935) as Paul- Bellair Ranch Hand
 Mutiny Ahead (1935) as Teeter Smith
 His Fighting Blood (1935) as Phil Elliott
 Don't Bet on Blondes (1935) as Betting Man (uncredited)
 Men Without Names (1935) as The Kid
 Let 'Em Have It (1935) as Sam
 Millions in the Air (1935) as Hank - the Drunk
 Bar 20 Rides Again (1935) as Gila
 The Eagle's Brood (1935) as Henchman Steve
 Valley of Wanted Men (1935) as Mike Masters
 The Throwback (1935) as Spike Travis
 Bulldog Courage (1935) as Bailey
 The Desert Trail (1935) as Jim Whitmonlee
 Mariners of the Sky aka Navy Born (1936) as Joe Vezie
 The Road to Glory (1936) as Second Volunteer
 The Ex-Mrs. Bradford (1936) as Lou Pender (uncredited)
 The Bridge of Sighs (1936) as Harrison Courtney Jr. aka Harry West
 Phantom Patrol (1936) as Henchman Jo-Jo Regan
 Yellowstone (1936) a Dynomite
 Straight from the Shoulder (1936) as Trigger Benson
 Charlie Chan at the Race Track (1936) as Lefty (uncredited)
 36 Hours to Kill (1936) as Gangster (uncredited)
 The Prisoner of Shark Island (1936) as David Herold
 After the Thin Man (1936) as Phil Brynes
 Wanted! Jane Turner (1936) as Crowley's Henchman
 The Accusing Finger (1936) as John 'Twitchy' Burke
 15 Maiden Lane (1936) as Agitator (uncredited)
 Two in a Crowd (1936) as Bonelli's Henchman
 Winterset (1936) as Joe
 The Plot Thickens (1936) as Joe
 Border Cafe (1937) as 'Doley' Dolson
 Armored Car (1937) as Slim
 Her Husband Lies (1937) as Lefty Harker (uncredited)
 Woman in Distress (1937) as Joe Emory
 The Game That Kills (1937) as Dick Adams
 Big City (1937) as Comet Night Watchman (uncredited)
 On Such a Night (1937) as Maxie Barnes
 Souls at Sea (1937) as Violinest
 King of Gamblers (1937) as Charlie
 It Can't Last Forever (1937) as Mikey (uncredited)
 Paid to Dance (1937) as Nifty
 Daughter of Shanghai (1937) as Miles (uncredited)
 Mannequin (1937) as Smooch Hanrahan (uncredited)
 Conquest (1937) as Dumb Soldier (uncredited)
 Hot Water (1937) as Homer (uncredited)
 The Saint of New York (1938) as Phil Farrell - Doorman at the Silverclub (uncredited)
 Mr. Moto's Gamble (1938) as Gangster (uncredited)
 Smashing the Rackets (1938) as Maxie
 The Crowd Roars (1938) as Joe - Bodyguard on Plane (uncredited)
 Crime Ring (1938) as Slim (uncredited)
 Penitentiary (1938) as Bunch (uncredited)
 King of Alcatraz (1938) as 'Nails' Miller
 The Night Hawk (1938) as Spider
 Mr. Moto's Gamble (1938) as Gangster (uncredited)
 Crime Takes a Holiday (1938) as Louie
 Secrets of a Nurse (1938) as Smiley, Largo's Gunman (uncredited)
 When G-Men Step In (1938) as Clip Phillips - Fred's Henchman
 Walking Down Broadway (1938) as Man in Baccarat Club Bar (uncredited)
 The Buccaneer (1938) as Dying Pirate
 Behind Prison Gates (1939) as Convict Petey Ryan
 They All Come Out (1939) as Vonnie (uncredited)
 News Is Made at Night (1939) as Joe Luddy
 Heritage of the Desert (1939) as Henchman Chick Chance
 Star Reporter (1939) as Clipper
 Two Thoroughbreds (1939) as Stablemaster
 Heroes in Blue (1939) as Henchman (uncredited)
 Those High Grey Walls (1939) as Nightengale
 Mutiny on the Blackhawk (1939) as Jock - the Sailor
 The Girl and the Gambler (1939) as Charlie
 Undercover Doctor (1939) as Monk Jackson
 Code of the Streets (1939) as Tommy Shay
 Almost a Gentleman (1939) as Kidnapper (uncredited)
 Disbarred (1939) as Stone (uncredited)
 The Ghost Breakers (1940) as Frenchy Duval
 Glamour for Sale (1940) as Louis Manell
 Queen of the Mob (1940) as Gang Leader in Garage (uncredited)
 The Fargo Kid (1940) as Deuce Mallory
 The Great Plane Robbery (1940) as Nick Harmon
 Trail of the Vigilantes (1940) as Lefty
 Triple Justice (1940) as Fred Cleary
 Black Diamonds (1940) as Matthews
 The Crooked Road (1940) as Nick Romero
 Dr. Cyclops (1940) as Dr. Mendoza
 Virginia City (1940) as Murrell's Henchman (uncredited)
 Outside the Three-Mile Limit (1940) as Bill Swanson
 Strange Cargo (1940) as Benet
 Black Friday (1940) as William Kane
 Down Mexico Way (1941) as Henchman Davis
 A Missouri Outlaw (1941) as Mark Roberts
 Public Enemies (1941) as Scat
 Mob Town (1941) as Monk Bangor (uncredited)
 Unfinished Business (1941) as Reporter (uncredited)
 Hold That Ghost (1941) as Lefty (uncredited)
 Citadel of Crime (1941) as Nick Garro
 Roar of the Press (1941) as 'Sparrow' McGraun
 Pittsburgh (1942) as Mine Operator
 Escape from Crime (1942) as Dude Mevill
 Hitler – Dead or Alive (1942) as Joe 'The Book' Conway
 Youth on Parade (1942) as Nick Cramer (uncredited)
 Highways by Night (1942) as Gabby
 Mug Town (1942) as Marco
 That Other Woman (1942) as Tough Guy
 Dr. Gillespie's New Assistant (1942) as Husband (uncredited)
 Kid Glove Killer (1942) as Allison Stacy (uncredited)
 Alias Boston Blackie (1942) as Steve Cavereni
 Sleepytime Gal (1942) as Johnny Gatto
 South of Santa Fe (1942) as Joe Keenan aka Harmon
 Jail House Blues (1942) as Danny
 Captive Wild Woman (1943) as Gruen
 Sherlock Holmes and the Secret Weapon (1943) as Mueller (uncredited)
 In Old Oklahoma (1943) as Cherokee Kid
 Petticoat Larceny (1943) as Louie (uncredited)
 Bombardier (1943) as Big Guy - Spy (uncredited)
 The Unknown Guest (1943) as Fain
 The Fighting Seabees (1944) as Ding
 Tall in the Saddle (1944) as Bob Clews (also co-writer)
 Back to Bataan (1945) as Bindle Jackson
 Grissly's Millions (1945) as Lewis Bentley
 Flame of Barbary Coast (1945) as Calico Jim
 Dakota (1945) as Carp
 Tycoon (1947) as Joe
 Angel and the Badman (1947) as Mouse Marr (uncredited)
 Force of Evil (1948) as Bill Ficco
 The Plunderers (1948) as Calico
 Angel in Exile (1948) as Carl Spitz
 Red River (1948) as Teeler Yaces
 Wake of the Red Witch (1948) as Antonio "Ripper" Arrezo
 The Fighting Kentuckian (1949) as Beau Merritt
 She Wore a Yellow Ribbon (1949) as Gunrunner (uncredited)
 Fighting Man of the Plains (1949) as Yancy
 Hellfire (1949) as Dusty Stoner
 California Passage (1950) as Whalen
 Surrender (1950) as Deputy Williams
 Bullfighter and the Lady (1951) as Joseph Jamison (uncredited)
 Warpath (1951) as Pvt. Fiore
 The Great Missouri Raid (1951) as Sgt. Brill
 Ride the Man Down (1952) as Ray Cavanaugh
 What Price Glory (1952) as Gowdy (uncredited)
 Denver and Rio Grande (1952) as Engineer Moynihan
 Big Jim Mclain (1952) as Voice of Chauncey (uncredited)
 Fair Wind to Java (1953) as Wilson
 Island in the Sky (1953) as Wally Miller
 Hondo (1953) as Major Sherry
 Devil's Canyon (1953) as Gatling Guard
 Star of Texas (1953) as Luke Andrews
 The High and the Mighty (1954) as Frank Briscoe
 Johnny Guitar (1954) as Eddie
 Blood Alley (1955) as Mr. Tso
 The Sea Chase (1955) as Max Heinz
 Top of the World (1955) as Maj. George French
 Santiago (1956) as Trasker
 Star in the Dust (1956) as Mike MacNamara
 Stagecoach to Fury (1956) as Tim O'Connors
 Giant (1956) as Dr. Horace Lynnton
 Toward the Unknown (1956) as Lt. Gen. Bryan Shelby
 The Bad Seed (1956) as Richard Bravo
 Man in the Vault (1956) as Herbie
 Man in the Shadow (1957) as Herb Parker
 The Devil's Hairpin (1957) as Doc Addams
 Night Passage (1957) as Mr. Feeney
 Jet Pilot (1957) as Major Rexford
 Night Passage (1957) as Clarence Feeney
 Lafayette Escadrille (1958) as U. S. General
 The Notorious Mr. Monks (1958) as Benjamin Monks
 Guns Girls and Gangsters (1959) as Lon Largo
 Wagon Train : The Amos Billings Story (1962, TV Series) as Amos Billings
 To Kill A Mockingbird (1962) as Judge Taylor
 The Outrage (1964) as Indian
 Mail Order Bride (1964) as Sheriff Jess Linley
 The Sons of Katie Elder (1965) as Sheriff Billy Watson
 Shenandoah (1965) as Dr. Tom Witherspoon
 Baby the Rain Must Fall (1965) as Judge Ewing
 El Dorado (1966) as Dr. Miller
 Incident at Phantom Hill (1966) as General Hood
 Ride Beyond Vengeance (1966) as Hanley
 An Eye for an Eye (1966) as Brien Quince
 Nevada Smith (1966) as Sheriff Bonnell
 Welcome to Hard Times (1967) as Major Munn C.S.A.
 The Ballad of Josie (1967) as Alpheus Minisk
 Day of the Evil Gun (1968) as Sheriff Kelso
 Hellfighters (1968) as Dusty Stoner
 The Undefeated (1969) as General Joe Masters
 Young Billy Young (1969) as Charlie
 Dirty Dingus Magee (1970) as Chief Crazy Blanket
 Zabriskie Point (1970) as Roadhouse Owner
 Shoot Out (1971) as Brakeman Frenatore
 Something Big (1971) as Chief Yellow Sun
 Night of the Lepus (1972) as Sheriff Cody
 Pat Garrett and Billy The Kid (1973) as Maxwell
 Cahill U.S. Marshal (1973) as Old Man
 Grayeagle (1977) as Running Wolf
 Wanda Nevada (1979) as Texas Curly

Film writer
 Tall in the Saddle (Screenplay)
 Ring of Fear (Original Screenplay)

Television
 The Lone Ranger – episode – Million Dollar Wallpaper – Silk (1950)
 Adventures of Superman (Credits Paul Fix) – Episode Season 1 Episode 22 – Czar of the Underworld (1953)
 Adventures of Superman (Credits Peter Fix) – Episode Season 2 Episode 18 – Semi-Private Eye (1954)
 Perry Mason – episode - The Case of the Angry Mourner - District Attorney Hale (1957)
 The Restless Gun - episode - Jody - as Jake Burnett (1957)
 The Rifleman – 123 episodes appeared in, and credit only for 27 episodes – Marshall Micah Torrance, and Charming Billy for 1 episode (1958–1963)
 Wagon Train – episode – The Mark Hanford Story – Jake (1958)
 Perry Mason – Season 2 Episode 6 - The Case of the Buried Clock - District Attorney Hale (1958)
 Wagon Train – episode – The Amos Billings Story – Amos Billings (1962)
 Wagon Train – episode – The Brian Conlin Story – Sean Bannon (1964)
 Lassie – episode – The Sulky Race – Sam Snow (1959)
 Ripcord – episode – Jump to a Blind Alley – Josh Parker (1963)
 The Twilight Zone – Colbey (1964) – Episode Season 5 Episode 26 – "I Am the Night Color Me Black"
 The F.B.I. – episode – How to Murder an Iron Horse – Willard Oberley (1965)
 Death Valley Days – episode – A Picture of a Lady – Doc Lathrop, with Peter Whitney as Judge Roy Bean and Francine York as Lily Langtry (1965)
 Star Trek: The Original Series – episode – Where No Man Has Gone Before – Dr. Mark Piper (1966)
 Daniel Boone (1964 TV series) – Quonab - S3/E2 "The Allegiances" (1966)
 A Man Called Shenandoah – episode – Plunder – Sam Winters (1966)
 Wild Wild West - episode - Night of the green terror - Old Chief (1966)
 Voyage to the Bottom of the Sea - S3/E5 - The Terrible Toys - Burke (1966)
 Bonanza – episode – The Gold Detector – Barney (1967)
 Gunsmoke - episode - Fandango - Doc Lacey (1967)
 Gunsmoke – episode – Vengeance Part 1 – Sheriff Sloan (1967)
 The Big Valley – episode – The Stallion – Brahma (1967)
 The Guns of Will Sonnett – episode #1 – Ride the Long Trail – Olenhaussen - Stableman (1967)
 Land Of The Giants – episode #9 "The Creed" Doctor Brule (1968)
 Land Of The Giants – episode #17 "Deadly Lodestone" Doctor Brule (1969)
 The Andy Griffith Show – episode – Barney Hosts a Summit Meeting – Mr. McCabe (1968)
 Daniel Boone (1964 TV series) – Chief Great Bear - S5/E16 "Three Score and Ten" (1969)
 The F.B.I. – episode – The Prey – Chester Cranford (1969)
 Death Valley Days season 17 episode 18 Here Stands Bailey - Brit Bailey (1969)
 The F.B.I. – episode – Incident in the Desert – Matt Williams (1970)
 Ironside – episode – The Laying on of Handy – Cripple (1970)
 Alias Smith and Jones – episode – The Day They Hanged Kid Curry – Tom Hansen (1971)
 Owen Marshall: Counselor at Law – episode – Make No Mistake – Dr. Mel Woodruff (1971)
 Alias Smith and Jones – episode – Night of the Red Dog – Clarence Bowles (1971)
 Bonanza – episode – For a Young Lady – Bufford Sturgis (1971)
 Mannix – episode – Scapegoat – Johnny Gunnarson (1972)
 Emergency! – episode – Fuzz Lady – Gus 'Pop' William (1972)
 Alias Smith and Jones – episode – Three to a Bed – Bronc (1973)
 The F.B.I. – episode – The Big Job – Farrell (1973)
 The Six Million Dollar Man – episode – Population: Zero – Joe Taylor (1974)
 Barnaby Jones – episode – Dark Legacy – Amos Barringer (1974)
 Doc Elliot – episode – The Pharmacist – Gus Turners (1974)
 The Waltons - episode - The Conflict - Senator Lucas Avery (1974)
 Barnaby Jones – episode – Death on Deposit – Alfred Stermer (1974)
 Barnaby Jones – episode – Double Vengeance – Jack Tatthal (1975)
 Emergency! – episode – Kidding – Maxwell Hart (1975)
 Lincoln – mini-series – episode – Prairie Law – Judge Thomas (1975)
 Ellery Queen – episode – The Adventure of the Sinister Scenario – Captain Benjamin Blake (1976)
 How The West Was Won – Mini series – episodes #1.2–1.4 – Portagee (1977–1978)
 The Rockford Files – episode – The House On Willis Avenue – Joseph Tooley (1978)
 Battlestar Galactica – episode – Take The Celestra – Commander Kronus (1979)
 Quincy M.E. – episode – For Want of A Horse – Jason Randall (1981) (final appearance)

References

External links
 
 Paul Peter Fix Collection (AFC/2001/001/00534), Veterans History Project, American Folklife Center, Library of Congress.

 Paul Fix at Battlestar Wiki, an encyclopedia of the Battlestar Galactica'' sagas
 
 

1901 births
1983 deaths
20th-century American male actors
American male film actors
American male television actors
American people of German descent
Deaths from kidney failure
Male actors from Los Angeles
Male actors from New York (state)
Male Western (genre) film actors
Military personnel from New York (state)
New York National Guard personnel
People from Dobbs Ferry, New York
United States Army soldiers
United States Navy corpsmen
United States Navy personnel of World War I
Western (genre) television actors
Burials at Woodlawn Memorial Cemetery, Santa Monica